The Perijá antpitta (Grallaria saltuensis) is a species of bird in the antpitta family. It is endemic to the Serranía del Perijá on the border of Colombia and Venezuela. In 2016, it was elevated from subspecies of rufous antpitta to full species on the basis of its different vocalizations from the other members of the species complex.

Taxonomy 
The Perijá antpitta was described as a subspecies of rufous antpitta (Grallaria rufula saltuensis) in 1946, but in 2016 was elevated to species status on the basis of its vocalizations and olivaceous plumage. It is recognized by the HBW and BirdLife Checklist. In 2020, a new study provided additional genetic evidence  and vocal analysis for its classification as species.

It is sometimes believed to be conspecific with the Tawny antpitta, however the Perijá antpitta is smaller and has significant differences in plumage.

The Perijá antpitta gets its name from the mountain range in which it is confined, the Serranía del Perijá.

Distribution and habitat 
The Perijá antpitta is found entirely within the Serranía del Perijá, and is found in the Venezuelan state Zulia, and the Colombian departments of La Guajira and Cesar. It is found at elevations of 2300-3650m. It is protected in part of its range by the Sierra de Perijá National Park, Venezuela. It prefers humid montane forest and is mostly found in the forest understory and on the forest floor. It can also be found at forest borders and nearby disturbed habitat.

The Perijá antpitta is separated from the closely related Muisca antpitta by the Serranía de Los Motilones, and from the also closely related Sierra Nevada antpitta by the Cesar depression that separates the Perijá range from the Sierra Nevada de Santa Marta.

Status 
The Perijá antpitta is rated near threatened by the IUCN Red List due to its decreasing population trend and the threat of deforestation for narcotic cultivation and mineral extraction. Between 2,500 and 10,000 mature individuals are believed to exist in the wild.

References 

Grallaria
Birds of Colombia
Birds of Venezuela
Endangered species